Animal Crackers is a 2017 3D computer-animated comedy-fantasy film directed by Scott Christian Sava and Tony Bancroft, and written by Sava and Dean Lorey, based on the animal-shaped cookie and loosely based on the graphic novel by Sava. The film stars the voices of Emily Blunt, John Krasinski, Danny DeVito, Ian McKellen, Sylvester Stallone, Patrick Warburton, Raven-Symoné, Harvey Fierstein, Wallace Shawn, Gilbert Gottfried, Tara Strong, James Arnold Taylor, Kevin Grevioux, and introducing Lydia Rose Taylor in her film debut. It tells the story of a family who comes across a box of magical animal crackers that turns anyone that consumes a cracker into the animal that the cracker represents which comes in handy in saving the circus that the family was associated with.

The film premiered at the Annecy International Animation Film Festival on June 12, 2017. It was released in China on July 21, 2018. It was initially set to be released in the United States but faced multiple delays due to being picked up by various distributors, who faced financial difficulties.

It was officially released on Netflix on July 24, 2020 and received mixed reviews from critics.

Plot
In 1962, brothers “Buffalo” Bob and Horatio Huntington run a traveling circus together, doing well in spite of their vastly different personalities. After a show, the circus' resident gypsy fortune teller Esmerelda presents her beautiful niece Talia to her employers, asking them to give her a job. Bob and Horatio are both immediately smitten with the lovely woman, but her affections are solely for Bob.

When the pair announce their plans to marry in 1964, Horatio becomes furious and delivers an ultimatum to his brother to choose either him or Talia. Bob marries Talia and Esmerelda gives them a mysterious box as a wedding gift, which allows them to open a new circus. Buffalo Bob's Rootin' Tootin' Animal Circus, known for animals performing amazing and seemingly impossible feats.

Years later, Bob's nephew Owen marries his childhood friend Zoe at the circus where they had first met as kids. Following the initial excitement however, Owen soon discovers he now has to work as a taste tester for Zoe's father Mr. Woodley at his dog biscuit factory. His co-worker Binkley is trying to create a new type of dog biscuit which keeps getting ruined by Mr. Woodley's personal assistant Brock.

A few years later, Horatio, whose luck has taken a serious downturn since his fight and split with Bob, sneaks into Bob and Talia's dressing rooms, trying to find the secret to the magic animals, and accidentally starts a fire which apparently kills Bob and Talia. Their funeral is attended by Owen, Zoe, and their daughter Mackenzie. Horatio makes an unexpected visit and announces that he'll be taking over the circus. Huntington and his henchmen Mario Zucchini, Samson, Stabby, and El Diablo start a fight, causing the Huntingtons to leave.

Before they leave, circus pets Old Blue and Zena give the Huntingtons the mysterious box, they later discover it holds animal cracker cookies. Owen eats one and turns into a hamster. The Huntingtons return to the circus to figure out how this happened. They learn from the clown Chesterfield that the animal crackers will turn the user into the animal they eat, but it contains only one human cookie to change them back. Later, he tells them they inherited the circus. Zoe is excited, but Owen, determined to please Mr. Woodley, decides to continue his job. Zoe restores the circus while Owen stays at the dog biscuit factory. Frustrated that Zoe quit her job, Mr. Woodley begins to consider Brock as her replacement.

Buffalo Bob's Rootin' Tootin' Animal Circus reopens, but is a disaster upon the discovery of no animals. Owen reluctantly decides to eat the animal crackers and performs stunts as an animal. By the end of the day, Owen grows to like it and decides to quit his job. As his finishes packing up though, Brock unwittingly eats one of the cookies and turns into a drill. To catch up with him, Owen turns into a lion, but Brock gets captured by Mario Zucchini, who also steals cookie pieces. Upon returning home, Owen soon discovers he has lost the human cookie and will remain an animal forever. He attempts to adapt to life as a different animal, but has little success. Binkley discovers the animal crackers and aggressively persuades Mr. Woodley to attend the circus.

At one performance, Horatio appears and offers Owen's gorilla form his human cookie (which Mario had also unknowingly stolen) in exchange for the circus. Owen refuses, thinking that remaining an animal will at least keep his family together, but he is forced into the deal by Horatio's hybridized henchmen as they help Horatio force-feed him the human cookie. The circus performers then come across the scene and a fight breaks out, with some of them assuming animal forms to fight.

As his henchmen are defeated, Horatio eats some crackers and turns into a chimera. He then is confronted by Old Blue and Zena who reveal themselves as Bob and Talia, alive but forever trapped in animal form due to the destruction of their human cookies in the fire. They ask Horatio to redeem himself, but he refuses. Horatio flies up, grasping them. Owen uses Bullet Man in his rhinoceros form to shoot down Horatio as he, Horatio and Bob land in the net while Mackenzie turns into a monkey to save Talia. Afterwards, Owen, Zoe, and Mackenzie, and the circus performers work together to subdue Horatio. As Horatio vows to have his revenge, Owen turns him into a hamster as Bullet Man quotes "In Memoriam A.H.H." from Alfred Lord Tennyson.

As the circus performers, Zoe, and Mackenzie regain their human forms, Chesterfield gleefully tells the caged henchmen that their human cookies are broken as a side-effect of eating the broken pieces and it will take him awhile to figure out whose parts go to whom. Mario subsequently tells Chesterfield to take his time, with the others in agreement. Horatio demands to be released from his hamster cage to no avail as he starts running on a hamster wheel.

Having witnessed the performance and Brock still being in drill form, Mr. Woodley reevaluates his views on both Owen and the circus. With Binkley, he decides to create a new circus souvenir using her failed experiments. By the next show, they have made animal crackers that cause the eater's skin to temporarily take on the color and patterns of the animal whose cracker they eat. Owen consumes a new dragon animal cracker that just appeared in the box and takes the stage in his new animal form.

Cast

 John Krasinski as Owen Huntington, MacKenzie's father, Zoe's husband, Talia’s step-nephew, Horatio and Buffalo Bob's nephew and the circus owner.
 Brendan Sava portrays young Owen.
 Emily Blunt as Zoe Huntington, MacKenzie's mother, Owen's wife, Talia’s stepniece-in-law, Horatio and Buffalo Bob's niece-in-law.
 Noelle Ellison Thomason portrays young Zoe.
 Danny DeVito as Chesterfield, the circus's funniest clown who had gotten fat from the foods that he ate.
 Ian McKellen as Horatio P. Huntington, Buffalo Bob's older brother, Owen's uncle, Zoe's uncle-in-law, and Mackenzie's great uncle who was envious of his brother's success. He hates it when Zucchini calls him his "henchman" and keeps correcting him because he is his master, not his henchman. Horatio's Chimera form has the head of a lion, the horns of a ram, the body of an alligator, the wings of a bat, the tail of a snake, an unspecified reptilian arms, and four unspecified reptilian limbs.
 Sylvester Stallone as Bulletman, the human cannonball in a bullet-shaped helmet who only says his name until the end of the movie.
 Patrick Warburton as Brock, a big strong personal assistant of Mr. Woodley who likes to pick on Owen and Binkley.
 Raven-Symoné as Binkley, Zoe's childhood friend and Owen's co-worker who works to make the type of dog biscuit to impress Mr. Woodley.
 Wallace Shawn as Mr. Woodley, Zoe's father, Mackenzie's grandpa, and Owen's father-in-law who runs a dog biscuit factory. He originally didn't like that Owen was Zoe's husband and kept calling Owen a "deadly man", but later accepted it later in the film.
 Harvey Fierstein as Esmeralda, a gypsy fortune teller who is Talia's aunt and is the one who gave Bob the magical animal crackers that she got from Tibet.
 Gilbert Gottfried as Mario Zucchini, a midget motorcycle rider who thinks Horatio is his minion, which is actually the other way around as Horatio keeps correcting him. When Mario ate the broken pieces of the animal crackers, he sported the head and paws of a snowshoe hare and the shell and back legs of a tortoise while maintaining his hair, jacket, and pants.
 Tara Strong as Talia, Esmeralda's niece, Buffalo Bob's girlfriend, later wife, Owen's step-aunt, Zoe's step-aunt-in-law and Mackenzie's great step-aunt who is trapped in the form of a cat named Zena. She speaks with a soft Italian accent.
 James Arnold Taylor as Buffalo Bob, Talia's husband, Horatio's younger brother and Owen's uncle/former owner of the circus, Zoe's uncle-in-law and Mackenzie's great uncle who is trapped in the form of a bloodhound named Old Blue.
 Kevin Grevioux as Samson, a strongman with a beard and no hair who is one of Horatio's henchmen. When Samson ate the broken pieces of the animal crackers, he sported the head of a Texas Longhorn and the arms of a gorilla while maintaining his torso and legs giving him an appearance that is similar to the Minotaur.
 Lydia Rose Taylor as Mackenzie Huntington, Owen and Zoe's daughter, Mr. Woodley's granddaughter, Talia's great step-niece, Buffalo Bob and Horatio's great niece.
 Tony Bancroft as Stabby (uncredited in the Netflix release), a knife thrower and one of Horatio's henchmen. When Stabby ate the broken pieces of the animal crackers, he sported the head, stomach, and tail of a crocodile and the torso and paws of a Bengal tiger while maintaining his hair, goatee, and boots.
 Anthony Sava as El Diablo, a fire breather in a devil-like outfit and one of Horatio's henchmen. When El Diablo ate the broken pieces of the animal crackers, he sported the head of a frog and the wings of a bat in place of his arms while maintaining his outfit.
 Donna Lynne Sava as Petunia (uncredited in the Netflix release), a fat lady that Mario would be aroused by.
 Alyssa Trama as Gretchen, a former bearded lady who underwent electrolysis that Bob and Talia paid for.
 Noelle Ellis Thomas as Girl in Crowd (uncredited in the Netflix release)
 Logan Sava as Kid in Crowd (uncredited in the Netflix release)
 Kim Sava as Mom in Crowd

Additional voices by Cam Clarke, Lara Cody, Debi Derryberry, Jessica Gee, Grant George, Max Koch, Brianne Siddall, and Jennie Yee

Production

Development and writing
In 2011, Scott Christian Sava wrote a comic book for Animal Crackers but was unable to garner any interest. In June 2013, Harvey Weinstein had seen a short film of the screenplay made by Sava and two months later the Weinstein brothers made an offer to buy the rights to Animal Crackers. Sava co-directed the movie with Tony Bancroft and co-wrote the screenplay with Dean Lorey.

Financing the movie were executive producers Mu Yedong on behalf of Wen Hua Dongrun Investment Co., La Peikang, board chairman of China Film Co., and Sam Chi for Landmark Asia.

Despicable Me character designer, Carter Goodrich, was hired in October 2014.

Pre-production
The voice cast was completed by casting director Jamie Thomason who also serves as the voice director.

In the last week of October and throughout November, 2014, Sava via the Animal Crackers Facebook page, there were sneak peeks to the look of some characters along with announcing the voice cast for those characters Kevin Grevioux as Samson the Strong Man, James Arnold Taylor as Buffalo Bob, Tara Strong as Talia, Harvey Fierstein as Esmerelda the Fortune Teller, Gilbert Gottfried as Mario Zucchini, and Raven-Symoné as Binkley.

On November 6, 2014, Blue Dream Studios announced Sylvester Stallone, Danny DeVito, and Ian McKellen as lead voice cast. On February 3, 2015, John Krasinski and Kaley Cuoco joined the cast as Owen and Zoe Huntington, respectively. On March 30, 2015, Emily Blunt replaced Cuoco due to a scheduling conflict.

"When I was writing Animal Crackers I had specific voices in my head. Certain characters I wrote with actors in mind. Horatio was always Sir Ian McKellen. Brock was totally Patrick Warburton. Bullet-Man could be no one else but Stallone! To find out that each and every one of these actors have agreed to come on board this film and bring these characters to life… I'm flipping out," said Sava.

It was announced via Sava's Facebook page that his son, Brendan, would play 12-year-old Owen Huntington and his wife, Donna, would play the Fat Lady. On May 22, 2015, it was revealed that Wallace Shawn had been cast as Mr. Woodley, Zoe's (Blunt) father.

Animation
The film's animation is created on Autodesk Maya, and rendered on Arnold, in an effort to save costs, it was produced in Blue Dream Studios Spain an 5,000-square foot house Valencia that the director Sava founded In early 2014, more than 120 animators worked on the film.

Filming
On January 27, 2015, Sava announced on Facebook via the Animal Crackers page that first day of "studio sessions with the actors" began in Los Angeles.

Music
The film's original score was composed by Bear McCreary, and its soundtrack includes original songs by Toad the Wet Sprocket, Huey Lewis and the News, Howard Jones, and Michael Bublé.

Soundtrack

Score

All tracks written and composed by Bear McCreary.

Release

Theatrical
The film had its world premiere in competition at the Annecy International Animated Film Festival on June 12, 2017. The film was originally set to be released on April 28, 2017 by Relativity Media, however, a financial crisis within the company prevented them from releasing the film. It was then set to be released on September 1, 2017 by upstart film studio Serafini Releasing before they also shut down. A few months later, in November 2017, it was announced that Entertainment Studios would distribute the film worldwide. In April, Sava posted on Facebook that the film was set for a release date of August 10, 2018. The deal with Entertainment Studios was dropped in June 2018.

Eventually, the distribution rights were bought by Netflix and the film was released on July 24, 2020 on the platform. It was the second-most streamed film on its opening weekend.

Home media
The film will be released on digital and on-demand on April 18, 2023 by Lionsgate.

Reception

Critical response
On the review aggregator website Rotten Tomatoes, the film holds an approval rating of 64% based on 22 reviews, with an average rating of 6.00/10. It had a critical consensus which read: "Animal Crackers is far from the most distinctive animated fare, but its wacky humor and zippy speed make it a decent diversion for younger viewers." On Metacritic, the film has a weighted average score of 60 out of 100 based on 5 critics, indicating "mixed or average reviews".

References

External links
  on Netflix

2010s adventure comedy films
2010s children's comedy films
2010s fantasy comedy films
2017 computer-animated films
2017 films
American 3D films
American adventure comedy films
American children's animated adventure films
American children's animated comedy films
American children's animated fantasy films
American computer-animated films
American fantasy adventure films
American fantasy comedy films
Animated adventure films
Animated films about animals
China Film Group Corporation films
Chinese computer-animated films
Chinese animated films
Chinese 3D films
Circus films
Films about shapeshifting
Films directed by Tony Bancroft
Films set in 1962
Films set in Tennessee
Spanish 3D films
Spanish adventure comedy films
Spanish animated fantasy films
Spanish children's films
Spanish fantasy films
English-language Chinese films
English-language Spanish films
2017 comedy films
Films scored by Bear McCreary
2010s English-language films
2010s American films